Libs of TikTok is a far-right, anti-LGBT Twitter account owned by Chaya Raichik, a former real estate agent. The account spreads false claims and hate speech, especially relating to medical care of transgender children. It reposts content created by left-wing and LGBT people on TikTok, and on other social media platforms, often with hostile, mocking, or derogatory commentary. The account, also known by the handle @libsoftiktok, has over 1.5 million followers as of November 2022, and has become influential among American conservatives and the political right. Raichik runs the account by herself full-time and lives in Los Angeles. Libs of TikTok's social media accounts have received several temporary suspensions and a permanent suspension from TikTok.

Some of the account's posts have resulted in harassment against teachers, medical providers, children's hospitals, and LGBT venues. Libs of TikTok regularly slurs LGBT people, as well as those who provide mental health services to LGBT youth and LGBT sex education to students, as "groomers". Its followers "routinely attack individuals whose content is shared", and several dozen incidents of online or real life threats and harassment against a range of targets have been linked to Libs of TikTok's tweets, especially those where Raichik singles out specific events, locations or people. Fans of Libs of TikTok say the account simply reposts publicly available content showcasing "sex and gender ideology".

Libs of TikTok was originally the personal account of Raichik, who has continued to be the account's owner. Created in November 2020, the account became Libs of TikTok in April 2021. Libs of TikTok began receiving media attention in August 2021, including from conservative commentators and news outlets. Raichik remained anonymous until her identity was revealed in April 2022 by both software developer Travis Brown and The Washington Post journalist Taylor Lorenz. In August 2022, Libs of TikTok received substantial media attention after falsely claiming that gender-affirming hysterectomies were being provided to minors at the Boston Children's Hospital and at the Children's National Hospital. This resulted in a harassment campaign against both hospitals, including bomb threats.

Account history

Inception and original content (November 2020 – June 2021) 
The account was created in November 2020 as a personal account with the handle @shaya69830552, and later @shaya_ray. According to The Daily Dot, "in its early days, [the account] primarily existed as a reply account that routinely showed up in the comments of prominent conservatives on Twitter." Before becoming the Libs of TikTok account, Raichik downplayed the severity of COVID-19, promoted the conspiracy theory that the 2020 United States presidential election was stolen from Donald Trump through election fraud, and made posts showing that she was present at the 2021 United States Capitol attack. Raichik criticized the law enforcement officers at the Capitol, tweeting "[t]hey were rubber bullets from law enforcement. 1 hit right next to me." Raichik also tweeted that she did not enter the Capitol building like "a few crazy people" had and called the breach "mostly peaceful". Raichik later downplayed the attack, claiming it was peaceful compared to a "BLM protest", referring to Black Lives Matter. In early 2021, the account had less than 1,000 followers.

The account's handle was later changed to @cuomomustgo, focusing on demanding the resignation of the then-Governor of New York, Andrew Cuomo. The account also promoted efforts to recall the Governor of California, Gavin Newsom. By March 2021, the handle had changed to @houseplantpotus, a parody account tweeting as a houseplant in the White House of U.S. President Joe Biden. @houseplantpotus later became @libsoftiktok on April 19, 2021, promising to "help you find your daily dose of cringe".

In May and June 2021, before and during Pride Month, Libs of TikTok started posting anti-LGBT commentary, including her first tweet using "grooming" as a pejorative for LGBT people.

According to The Daily Dot, Raichik also ran the now-defunct Twitter account @NewYorkIsShitty.

Media attention (August 2021 – April 2022) 
In August 2021, podcaster Joe Rogan began promoting the account on The Joe Rogan Experience, leading to a large increase in followers. Prior to being promoted by Rogan, Libs of TikTok had amassed around 65,000 followers. That same month, lawyer and Republican Party operative Grant Lally filed a trademark for Libs of TikTok as a "news reporter service". The account has been promoted by Donald Trump Jr., by journalist Glenn Greenwald and by political commentators Tucker Carlson, Jesse Watters and Laura Ingraham; has been featured in the New York Post, The Federalist, The Post Millennial, Fox News and in other right-wing news outlets; and its posts have been retweeted by Meghan McCain.

In April 2022, Seth Dillon, CEO of conservative Christian satire website The Babylon Bee, announced a partnership with Libs of TikTok. Dillion later announced that he would financially support Libs of TikTok.

Prior to being revealed as the account creator, Raichik was interviewed anonymously on several occasions, during which she boasted that posts from the account led to the firings of several teachers. Raichik encouraged followers to join local school boards in order to remove teachers who teach about gender and sexuality. Raichik told the New York Post that "I don't do this for money or fame" and "I'm not some politician or blue-check journalist."

Identity revelation (April 2022) 
The account's creator endeavored to stay anonymous, appearing in newspaper and television interviews under the condition of anonymity. However, in April 2022, details began to surface about Libs of TikTok's identity. Software developer Travis Brown researched the history of the Libs of TikTok account and named Chaya Raichik as the account's creator. According to Federal Election Commission (FEC) donation records, Raichik donated to Republican politicians in 2020 and 2021.

On April 19, 2022, The Washington Post published an article by journalist Taylor Lorenz which further publicized the identity of Raichik, noting that she was an Orthodox Jew who worked in real estate in Brooklyn. These details were scraped from early iterations of the Libs of TikTok Twitter account. The online version of the article initially included a link to Raichik's real estate license, although this was later removed.

The article was controversial, mostly with American conservatives, who accused Lorenz of doxxing, antisemitism for mentioning Raichik's religion, and hypocrisy for having previously spoken out against online harassment. Raichik herself accused Lorenz of doxxing and told the New York Post that she "will never be silenced". Raichik also accused Lorenz of violating her right to free speech. In a tweet, Lorenz said that her "whole family was doxxed again this morning ... trolls have now moved on to doxxing and stalking any random friends I've tagged on Instagram." Lorenz argued that Raichik's information was already publicly available.

Some conservatives said Lorenz's visitation of the home of Raichik's relatives was harassment. Journalists responded by noting that visitations are a standard part of reporting procedure.

Lorenz and The Washington Post have stood by the reporting and Lorenz accused conservatives of trying to "sow doubt and discredit journalism". Cameron Barr, a senior managing editor at The Washington Post, wrote in a statement that the Post "did not publish or link to any details about [Raichik's] personal life". Some commentators, as well as Libs of TikTok, disputed this because the real estate license that the article initially linked to included a home address.

Libs of TikTok gained about 200,000 new Twitter followers in the day after the article was published.

Mid-2022 controversies (April – December 2022) 
In April 2022, following the publication of The Washington Post's article on Libs of TikTok, Twitter user @deletedtweet161, who tracks deleted posts, said that Libs of TikTok deleted "at least 20 tweets" over several days. 2,795 tweets had been deleted since the creation of the account, with some tweets being deleted to get access to the account restored following a suspension from Twitter.

In June 2022, Libs of TikTok had some of their tweets removed after they posted the locations of all ages drag shows in the United States. One location, in San Lorenzo, California, was stormed by the Proud Boys, a far-right extremist group. Pride events in Dallas and Coeur d'Alene have also been targeted by right-wing extremists after Libs of TikTok posted about them, with 31 Patriot Front members being arrested, before getting to their destination, for planning a riot in the Coeur d'Alene event. Raichik was reportedly encouraged to post about the Coeur d'Alene event by Dave Reilly, a local white nationalist known for participating in the 2017 Unite the Right rally. According to NPR, "there's no conclusive link between the posts and the extremist groups' activities," although investigators at the Alameda County Sheriff's Office believe that the Proud Boys confrontation was caused by Libs of TikTok.

On June 13, Raichik tweeted that she had "received about a dozen death threats", including threats from people threatening to throw a pipe bomb into her house.

On June 30, in Woodland, California, an alleged Proud Boys group tried to break into a bar that was about to host a drag event, as they yelled anti-LGBT insults. Days before, Libs of TikTok made a tweet about the upcoming event.

In late October, Raichik drew her followers' attention to a drag brunch being planned to benefit a local LGBT resource center in Sanford, North Carolina. Around 16 masked members of the Proud Boys showed up to protest the private event, yelling "groomers" at attendants and holding signs decrying "state-sponsored pedophilia". Raichik claimed that one of the performers booked for the brunch was a drag queen inspired by Satanism, although the individual she mentioned in her post was not invited to perform at the brunch. After Raichik posted about the brunch, the venue's owner said that she started to receive death threats on social media. Local law enforcement said that they were investigating threats against the event.

In November, a South Dakota State University LGBTQ student group was the target of a bomb threat being investigated by the University Police Department, after Libs of TikTok posted alleged footage of that year's annual drag event, which was advertised as all-ages. The student group and the performer at the center of the event said Libs of TikTok's video spliced together scenes of that year's event with the previous year's event, which had been age-restricted.

In December, a school in Clintonville, Ohio, canceled a drag queen storytime hour after a LibsofTikTok post on the upcoming event prompted the Proud Boys to prepare an armed march outside school grounds.

Children's hospital tweets and bomb threats (August – September 2022)

Boston Children's Hospital 
In August 2022, Libs of TikTok made around 13 tweets about the Boston Children's Hospital and their gender-affirming care, falsely claiming that they were providing gender-affirming hysterectomies to minors. One of these tweets contained a reposted video in which one of the hospital's gynecologists discusses a gender-affirming hysterectomy and Libs of TikTok captioned it as: "Boston Children's Hospital is now offering "gender-affirming hysterectomies" for young girls". The video was removed after the hospital started receiving a high volume of online criticism, despite the physician not suggesting that the procedure is offered to children.

The false claims that Boston Children's Hospital performs hysterectomies on young children were republished by prominent conservative commentators and conservative media outlets such as The Post Millennial. This resulted in the hospital, its employees, and providers receiving death threats, threats of violence, and other harassment via email, phone, and on the internet. According to Boston physician Michael O'Brien, "pediatric patients in Boston [Children's Hospital] are being seen with extra security" due to threats. The harassment campaign's effect on hospital phone systems temporarily impaired the ability of patients to speak with providers there.   Regarding Raichik's Twitter activity, he said that "Every single time [Raichik] claims not to have responsibility, but she continues to do the same thing" and that "She's very tactical, and purposefully tries not to break the terms of Twitter while knowing what she's doing is causing harm."

On August 30, the hospital received an anonymous bomb threat by phone which forced the hospital into a temporary lockdown, although it is unknown whether the threat was related to the harassment. On September 9, 2022, Boston Children's Hospital received a second bomb threat, which police likewise responded to. On September 15, the Federal Bureau of Investigation (FBI) announced that Catherine Leavy of Westfield, Massachusetts, a frequent donor to former president Donald Trump and the Republican Party, had been arrested in connection with the first bomb threat. She was charged with one count of making a false bomb threat through telephone and could face up to five years in prison. After the announcement, Libs of TikTok tweeted: "This is great news. Threats of violence should always be taken seriously." Before the announcement, Libs of TikTok predicted that the bomb threat came from "probably a left-wing troll".

The Washington Post, USA Today, NPR, and Politifact rejected Libs of TikTok's tweets and claims as false. According to the hospital's website and statements, the hospital adheres to medical guidelines developed by the World Professional Association for Transgender Health and gender-affirming care involving genital surgeries are only offered to patients between the ages of 18 and 35 while surgical consultations can be offered beginning at the age of 17. The hospital said in a statement that "we condemn these attacks in the strongest possible terms, and we reject the false narrative upon which they are based". When contacted by The Washington Post, Raichik did not answer a question about whether she felt responsible for the threats against the hospitals, but said that "we 100% condemn any acts/threats of violence". However, Libs of TikTok later said that she would not stop calling out hospitals and sharing information from them.

According to The Washington Post, an archived version of the hospital's website appeared to state that vaginoplasties, the surgical construction or reconstruction of a vagina, were available to 17-year-olds at the hospital. The hospital has since updated their website to reflect their policy of gender-affirming surgeries only being offered to patients between the ages of 18 and 35. The hospital also clarified that patients can only receive surgical consultations at 17.

On September 18, 2022, several protesters opposed to transgender youth services and around 200 counter-protesters gathered outside of Boston Children's Hospital on Longwood Avenue for several hours. Armed Boston police officers kept both groups separate.

Children's National Hospital and other hospitals 

On August 25, 2022, Libs of TikTok published a recording of phone operators at the Children's National Hospital, who incorrectly suggested that a 16-year-old transgender boy could be eligible for a hysterectomy at the hospital's gender development clinic. One employee incorrectly stated that even younger patients are eligible for a hysterectomy. Right-wing media outlets, including Fox News and The Daily Caller, published articles about the recording. A spokeswoman for the hospital stated: "None of the people who were secretly recorded by this activist group deliver care to our patients. We do not and have never performed gender-affirming hysterectomies for anyone under the age of 18." The hospital's website, in error, had previously stated that hysterectomies were provided to patients "between the ages of 0-21". The hospital has received harassment and "a large volume of hostile and threatening phone calls and emails", as well as bomb threats. As of September 2, 2022, the recording has been viewed more than 1.1 million times on Twitter.

In September 2022, Libs of TikTok reposted a 2019 story from Cleveland TV station WEWS-TV about Akron Children's Hospital providing gender-affirming care, including puberty blockers, for patients age 7 and higher. The account made several misleading follow-up posts about the hospital. Afterwards, the hospital temporarily took down the gender-affirming care section of their website after receiving threats from social media users. The hospital also took down information about its employees and the care they provide. In a statement, the hospital said that "We proudly stand behind the work of our program and providers". In response to the threats, Ohio representative Casey Weinstein tweeted: "Imagine going on Twitter to malign, attack and harass a children's hospital while hiding behind an anonymous account - and being proud of it".

That same month, Libs of TikTok posted about an adolescent clinic at Johns Hopkins All Children's Hospital, highlighting its practice of asking parents to step out of the room for a few minutes to give young patients a "safe space".

After being reinstated following a week-long suspension from Twitter, in October 2022, Libs of TikTok tweeted about Barbara Bush Children's Hospital offering gender-affirming care, which included a video from WMTW-TV about a transgender child who received care from the hospital. Libs of TikTok also tweeted "No matter how many times they try censoring and silencing us, we're never gonna stop the work we've started. We're not going anywhere."

The account has targeted other hospitals that provide gender-affirming care, in some cases with false claims, including a children's hospital in Omaha, Nebraska, UPMC Children's Hospital of Pittsburgh, and Phoenix Children's Hospital, leading to phoned-in threats and harassment. After Libs of TikTok's targeting of specific hospitals, other pediatric facilities including Chicago's Lurie Children's Hospital have faced harassment and false claims about care they provide. In September 2022, in response to Libs of TikTok's posts, Lurie Children's Hospital increased its security and moved a transgender youth support group from in-person meetings to online meetings.

Reactions 
NBC News has described Libs of TikTok as "one of the primary drivers of the harassment campaign" against Boston Children's Hospital.

Legal authorities in the state put out statements supporting the hospital and its patients, with a spokesman for the Boston Police Department stating that they were investigating the threats. The United States Department of Justice (DOJ) also launched an investigation into the threats and has spoken out in support of the hospital, saying that they will "ensure equal protection of transgender people under the law".

FBI Boston Special Agent in Charge Joseph Bonavolonta said that "Making threats of violence is not a prank — It's a federal crime.", adding that "These threats with innocent people at risk divert law enforcement from responding to actual emergencies are costly to taxpayers, and cause undue stress to victims and the community." The U.S. Attorney for Massachusetts Rachael Rollins called the attacks "disturbing", adding that "health care providers who support and offer care to gender-diverse and transgender individuals and their families deserve to do so without fear". Boston Mayor Michelle Wu condemned the threats being made against the hospital.

Harvard Law School clinical instructor and transgender activist Alejandra Caraballo said that "It's very disturbing to see people justify attacking a children's hospital because of their transphobia and their hatred of trans people". Michael Haller, a professor of pediatric endocrinology at the University of Florida, said that "A lot of people have chosen to try to be as quiet about their practice as they can to avoid those direct attacks" and that "Institutions have removed their websites, taken down their publicly facing phone numbers." Michelle Forcier, a clinician at LGBT telehealth group Folx Health, argued that "Kids are getting this significant messaging of, not only are you not okay, but we want to hurt you", adding "That's a pretty scary message to get as an 8-year-old or 12-year-old. It absolutely makes everybody think twice about walking in the door [to a hospital], kids and parents."

Colorado November shooting
On November 20, 2022, Libs of TikTok received renewed media attention following the Colorado Springs nightclub shooting, a mass killing that took place at an LGBTQ venue in which five people were killed and dozens more were injured. Club Q, the venue targeted by the shooter, frequently hosts drag events, including those advertised to an all-ages audience. The Independent noted that Libs of TikTok often attracts negative attention to such events with her social media accounts and that harassment and threats are often sent by her followers against patrons and performers following her postings. Hours after the shooting, Raichik used her Twitter account to target a "drag organization" in the same state where the massacre took place, underlining the names of two Colorado state legislators, one of whom was trans, for supporting it. The Advocate criticized the post, saying that: "In the hours after news of the Club Q shooting spread, Raichik, for example, doubled down on her anti-LGBTQ+ messaging by posting about other drag-inclusive events in the state." They drew attention to an interview previously published on their website with Juliette Kayyem, a former assistant secretary at the Department of Homeland Security, in which it was stated that social media accounts such as Libs of TikTok practice stochastic terrorism by provoking extremist outrage against marginalized groups, but using "vague language that allows the agitator to deny responsibility for the act".

Account suspensions

Twitter 
Twitter has temporarily suspended Libs of TikTok five times. On April 13, 2022, Libs of TikTok was suspended on Twitter for promoting "violence, threats or harassment against others based on their sexual orientation or other factors such as race or gender". The tweet that resulted in this suspension featured an image of a transgender woman; Libs of TikTok misgendered her and claimed she had used a women's locker-room. Libs of TikTok later deleted the tweet.

On August 27, 2022, Libs of TikTok received a one-week no-posting suspension from Twitter for "hateful conduct" and Twitter issued a warning that the account could be permanently banned. According to The Washington Post, the tweet that resulted in this suspension featured "Raichik again misidentif[ying] a person's gender." The tweet was later deleted by Libs of TikTok. In response to the suspension, Libs of TikTok said that "Getting suspended by Twitter has only made me realize my biggest mistake. I only called one hospital I should have called dozens because I promise you Children's National is not the only one. I promise to learn from my mistake and uncover more of what our Big Tech overlords don't want us to know. I will do better in the future."

On September 25, 2022, Libs of TikTok received a one-week suspension from Twitter and claimed that Twitter did not cite a reason for the suspension. However, The Babylon Bee CEO Seth Dillon said that Libs of TikTok was suspended for "hateful conduct" with "no specific tweets [being] flagged". In response to the suspension, Libs of TikTok hired a law firm that sent a letter threatening legal action against Twitter if they decide to permanently suspend Libs of TikTok. Libs of TikTok also created a legal defense fund and encouraged her supporters to donate to the fund. Libs of TikTok said that the suspension was "the result of a targeted harassment campaign from the Left to deplatform me", adding that "The truth is I haven't engaged in hateful conduct. I've just exposed the Left's depravity by reporting the facts. There's no rule against that, so they have to make up violations I've never committed".

On October 3, 2022, Libs of TikTok received another one-week suspension.

According to NPR, "Libs of TikTok appears to have evaded outright bans by coming right up to the edge of the platforms' rules but not breaking them", adding that the account "does not explicitly encourage followers to threaten anyone, and typically uses its target's own words, sometimes stripped of context, to imply wrongdoing." According to Joan Donovan, research director of the Shorenstein Center on Media, Politics and Public Policy, Libs of TikTok's practice of deleting content before a platform takes action is a common tactic for digital actors spreading disinformation.

LGBT advocates on Twitter have advocated for Twitter to permanently suspend Libs of TikTok.

From roughly August to October 2022, Libs of TikTok was the subject of significant internal conversation at Twitter, with some employees arguing that the account should be permanently banned due to its potential for inciting violence. After Elon Musk acquired Twitter and became its CEO in October 2022, the site's moderation activity was reduced significantly. On December 9, journalist Bari Weiss, as part of an analysis of internal Twitter communications in the pre-Musk era dubbed the "Twitter Files", revealed that Twitter had secretly operated to limit Libs of TikTok's reach via shadow banning, in addition to the known suspensions. Musk later stated that the site's content guidelines were historically enforced against accounts expressing right-wing views while being ignored for those that expressed left-wing views. Conversely, Evan Urquhart of Slate argued that Weiss' own publishing revealed that Libs of TikTok was receiving preferential treatment, with moderators directed not to take any action against the account and to instead elevate issues to higher management. Urquhart further argued that Weiss' portrayal of Libs of TikTok dangerously conflated conservative opinions with stochastic terrorism and extremism.

Other platforms 
Libs of TikTok had an account on TikTok itself, but it was suspended for violating TikTok's community guidelines in March 2022.

On May 27, Libs of TikTok was suspended by Instagram. That same day, the account suspension was reversed. A Meta spokesperson told The Daily Dot that "this account was automatically disabled following multiple copyright complaints" and that "we investigated further and found an issue following one of the complaints, so we restored the account".

On August 17, Libs of TikTok was suspended by Facebook for violating the platform's "community standards"; according to Raichik, she was told it was "permanent". After less than a day, the account was reinstated. Facebook said that the account was suspended in error. LGBT organization GLAAD criticized the reinstatement of the account.

On August 30, activists launched a campaign to pressure e-commerce platform Shopify into dropping Libs of TikTok. The activists have claimed that Raichik's store violates Shopify's acceptable use policy, which bans hateful content, as well as goods or services that lead to harassment, bullying, or threats. As of September 1, over 4,300 users have submitted reports to Shopify to drop Libs of TikTok. In a statement, Shopify defended Libs of TikTok, saying that "We host businesses of all stripes and sizes, with various worldviews".

Content 
Libs of TikTok has been described as right-wing, far-right, extreme right-wing, conservative, and extremist. The Times of London described the account as a "Twitter provocateur".

Libs of TikTok's early content focused on reposts of videos by progressives about Anthony Fauci and vaccinations that it deemed cringeworthy. The account's early content also mocked perceived liberal hypocrisy and "wokeness". Slate linked Libs of TikTok's early success to "shamelessly tagging alt-right and far-right heavy hitters on Twitter, a strategy she continues to use to this day".

Libs of TikTok promotes conservatism and anti-LGBT rhetoric. In reference to a preschool that held a gay pride march, the account stated, "stop sending your kids to indoctrination camps". It has encouraged followers to contact schools that allowed transgender students to use bathrooms corresponding to their gender identity. Libs of TikTok also aims to "spread the horrors of what doctors are doing to young, confused individuals".

Libs of TikTok has also said that adults teaching children about LGBT identities is abusive and constitutes child grooming. In since-deleted tweets, the account specifically accused Chasten Buttigieg and The Trevor Project organization of grooming. The account argued in another since-deleted tweet that any teacher who comes out as gay to their students should be fired. The account has claimed that being gender non-conforming or being an ally of the LGBT community is a "mental illness", and deliberately misgendered transgender people. In a since-deleted tweet, Libs of TikTok stated, "Men should not wear dresses. You can't change my mind."

Libs of TikTok opposes gender-affirming surgery on children, arguing that it is mass scale child abuse and that "Any doctor performing these surgeries should have their license revoked. They belong in prison".

The account has been criticized for spreading hoaxes, including the litter boxes in schools hoax about bathroom accommodations for students that identified as cats, and for spreading false claims such as that students in a second-grade class in Austin, Texas were being taught about furries, and that U.S. Representative Katie Porter had argued that pedophilia is not a crime after Porter simply lamented that LGBT people were being slandered as pedophiles and groomers on social media. The account has also posted, or been accused of posting, edited footage of drag events, in one case resulting in bomb threats against the audience and the performer in North Dakota, and in a separate incident resulting in death threats against a drag performer who eventually resigned from a teaching position in Alabama.

Libs of TikTok has denied the existence of systemic racism, but argued that racism against white people was "flourishing" in the United States. Reporting by Slate stated that "Raichik's feed is colored by an intense hostility to liberals generally, but she holds an especially pronounced animosity toward LGBTQ people, city dwellers, and Black people who have been killed at the hands of police", noting that the account has referred to George Floyd as a criminal, and mocked the killing of Ma'Khia Bryant.

The most popular video posted on Libs of TikTok, with 5.7 million views, was taken by a female student of color at Arizona State University and shows her and her friend repeatedly asking a white male student to leave a multicultural center due to a "Police Lives Matter" sticker on his laptop. After the video went viral, ASU investigated and then reprimanded the two female students.

After gaining popularity on Twitter, Libs of TikTok has since expanded to additional social media platforms, including Instagram, YouTube, Rumble, Gab and Gettr. Libs of TikTok also sells merchandise on e-commerce platform Shopify and sells subscriptions on online newsletter platform Substack. According to Erin Reed, a content creator and legislative researcher, "Libs of TikTok relies on monetizing through Shopify and Substack. They use these funds in continuing their work to target children's hospitals and getting them shut down".

Impact

Impact on teachers 
Some people, usually teachers, have faced harassment and sometimes death threats after Libs of TikTok reposted their videos.

On December 23, 2021, an 8th grade English teacher in Owasso, Oklahoma posted a video to TikTok about supporting LGBT students, in which he stated: "If your parents don't accept you for who you are, fuck them. I'm your parents now. I'm proud of you. Drink some water. I love you". In April 2022, Libs of TikTok posted the video, and the clip went viral. The teacher received death threats and other online harassment as a result, and resigned soon thereafter. Libs of TikTok later made a post claiming, without evidence, that the teacher was fired "after complaints of grooming". Some parents defended the teacher, saying that he provided a "safe haven" for LGBT students. Other parents said that some of the teacher's TikToks were inappropriate. Oklahoma Republican Senate candidate Jackson Lahmeyer accused the teacher of being a "predator". As of May 9, 2022, the repost has more than 460,000 views.

A teacher in California was placed on administrative leave after a video she posted joking about asking her students to pledge allegiance to a Pride flag was reposted by Libs of TikTok on August 27, 2021. After conservative and far-right accounts attacked her on social media, she deleted all of her social media accounts.

On November 16, 2021, an assistant professor at Old Dominion University, was placed on administrative leave after an interview in which the professor argued that pedophilia should be destigmatized was posted on the Libs of TikTok account and went viral. On November 24, the professor resigned from their position.

On March 9, 2022, Libs of TikTok posted a screenshot from a TikTok made by an Indiana teacher who said that she allows the students who participate in her school's Gay-Straight Alliance club (which she leads) to tell their parents that it is a study group instead. Libs of TikTok tagged the teacher's school district in the post, and said: "We have seen multiple examples already of teachers grooming kids in a GSA club behind parents' backs." The teacher later deleted her TikTok account.

On April 13, 2022, Libs of TikTok reposted a TikTok of a woman explaining why she supports teachers who educate their students about "sexual orientation and gender identity" without parental consent. Libs of TikTok also said that "this is what the left really thinks" and that "they want to take your kids to groom and indoctrinate them behind your back". After Libs of TikTok's followers sent harassment to the woman, she uploaded a new TikTok on April 14 in which she said that "bigots" accused her of child sexual abuse "because they thought I was a teacher who thought it's OK to teach kids it's OK to be gay". As of May 9, 2022, the TikTok had more than 500,000 views.

On July 18, 2022, Libs of TikTok posted a photo of a first-grade teacher of the Wauwatosa School District with the quote "we had a great pronoun discussion today" being attributed to the teacher. The post spread to far-right forums, including Patriots.win. Afterwards, the teacher received homophobic comments, death threats, harassment, and posts calling for him to be fired. The Wauwatosa School District acknowledged the situation on Twitter and Superintendent Demond Means defended the teacher, saying that "the negativity that both [the teacher] and his principal have received nationally definitely does not represent the values of our school district. We stand in full support of these two outstanding educators."

In October 2022, a Huntsville, Alabama animal shelter received death threats and negative reviews on Google after Libs of TikTok reposted a video from the shelter showing a middle school teacher reading in drag. Libs of TikTok alleged that the teacher "made a series of lewd sexual innuendos and jokes" to a room "full of children", including the comment that "everyone likes a big bone" after reading a story about a dog digging for a bone. The Huntsville School District put the teacher on indefinite paid administrative leave while they investigate. The teacher argued that his comments were not any worse "than any innuendo from almost any 'kids' movie from the last 40 years." The animal shelter defended the teacher and the event he participated in, saying that "We are going to be operating as a dog rescue and training business who is inclusive and open to anybody who wants to be here and be kind to others." The teacher also received death threats.

A transgender teacher in Los Angeles received death threats and insults after a video they posted denouncing the Florida Parental Rights in Education Act was reposted by Libs of TikTok.

According to Euronews, "some of the people targeted by [Libs of TikTok] have received hundreds or even thousands of hate comments." According to a report by the left-leaning media watchdog group Media Matters for America, the account has named or tagged around 222 educational institutions and teachers in 2022 as of April 28.

On a conservative podcast, Raichik stated "it's not easy to be the one responsible for that, for someone losing their job. On the other hand, I mean these people, some of them are literally evil, and they are grooming kids."

Political impact 
Florida governor Ron DeSantis's press secretary Christina Pushaw credited the account for "opening her eyes" on the current state of education around sexuality- and LGBT-related topics. Pushaw has interacted with the Libs of TikTok account more than 100 times since July 16, 2021. Fox News host Tucker Carlson has credited Libs of TikTok, and Pushaw's championing of it, as partly responsible for Florida's passage of the 2022 Parental Rights in Education bill (commonly called the "Don't Say Gay bill"), which prohibits instruction on sexuality and gender identity in age-inappropriate ways from kindergarten to third grade in public schools.

Libs of TikTok was one of the top-ten most influential Twitter accounts in promoting use of the pejorative term groomer after the passage of Florida's Parental Rights in Education bill, according to a report by the Center for Countering Digital Hate and the Human Rights Campaign. Raichik uses the term as a pejorative for LGBT people, supporters of LGBT youth, and those who teach about sexuality.

Other 
According to a report by Advance Democracy Inc., tweets by Libs of TikTok result in a spike in mentions of specific hospitals and doctors across Twitter. In many of the mentions, doctors are referred to as "child molesters", "pedos", "groomers", and "butchers".

Drag queens and drag events organizers said that they received harassment and threats after tweets from Libs of TikTok about them and their work. In 2021, Libs of TikTok encouraged its followers to call child protective services (CPS) on a transgender couple who were shown in the Facebook Watch documentary series 9 Months with Courteney Cox attempting to breastfeed their newborn baby.

In July 2022, OutLoud North Bay, a centre for LGBT youth in Ontario, received hate messages and death threats after Libs of TikTok posted tweets in response to the centre announcing a drag show for children. Also in July, Libs of TikTok made a tweet criticizing the Conservative Jewish camping network, Camp Ramah in Northern California, for "housing kids according to their gender identity rather than birth sex".

On August 10, 2022, Libs of TikTok reposted a video of a therapist who works with sex offenders who have been jailed. In the video, the therapist says their pronouns and advises people to use the term "minor-attracted persons" (MAPs) instead of "pedophiles", arguing that the latter term has "moved from being a diagnostic label to being a judgmental, hurtful insult that we hurl at people in order to harm them or slander them". They also argue that pedophiles do not choose their attraction to children and should not be solely defined by that one aspect of themselves. Libs of TikTok only posted the first two minutes of the video, which made it sound like the therapist was advocating for acceptance of pedophilia and for people to be nicer to child sex abusers. In the full version of the video, the therapist condemns child sex abuse crimes. Libs of TikTok's reposted video has been promoted by Russian and European disinformation networks, such as Tsargrad TV.

Michael O'Brien, a pediatrics resident at a hospital in South Carolina, said that he received threats after Libs of TikTok, on August 15, retweeted a tweet in which he had criticized the account. O'Brien reported some of the threats to his employer's public safety office: "I got three specific threats that came from within a 50-mile radius of where I live", adding that "The threats felt very tangible. I had to take action to protect my partner and warn my family."

In September 2022, Libs of TikTok claimed that workshops for transgender youth and their families run by the American healthcare company Kaiser Permanente were being held "without parental consent" despite the workshops being designed for both children and parents. Also in September 2022, a tea shop in Salt Lake City reported receiving "an endless barrage of harassment" after Libs of TikTok's Instagram account reposted a video featuring a young girl dancing with a drag queen inside the tea shop.

On September 23, 2022, a two minute video of Dr. Katherine Gast (co-director at the University of Wisconsin-Madison's UW Health gender services program) describing gender-affirming surgeries was reposted by Libs of TikTok with the caption: "Gast happily describes some of the "gender affirming" surgeries she offers to adolescents including vaginoplasties, phalloplasties, and double mastectomies." In an emailed response to NBC News, Libs of TikTok stood by her characterization of doctors who work in transgender healthcare. Although Gast does not perform genital surgery on minors, she does perform mastectomies (also known as "top surgery") in some cases for older teenagers after evaluations by mental health care professionals and doctors, and with parental consent. The original tweet by Libs of TikTok received almost half a million views, one of eight in a thread about Gast and her patients. Senator Ted Cruz tweeted: "She does this to children. Sterilizes & mutilates them. Before they are old enough to consent." Gast and her family were doxxed and her clinic has received "harassing phone calls".

After analyzing Libs of TikTok's online activity in April 2022 through November 2022, a counter-extremism research group called Task Force Butler Institute estimated Raichik singled out a specific event, location or person over 280 times, resulting in 66 incidents of harassment or threats against her targets.

Reception

Response to account content 
The account has been described as promoting harassment against and criticizing teachers, medical providers, and children's hospitals. It has been called a hate-speech account. It has also been described as spreading misinformation and/or disinformation by reposting videos clips of LGBT people, teachers, schools and other institutions out of context and with incendiary framing. While fans and supporters of Libs of TikTok say the account simply reposts content showcasing "sex and gender ideology" that was already publicly available, "the account’s followers are rabidly anti-LGBTQ+ and routinely attack individuals whose content is shared."

Raichik has described Libs of TikTok's reposting of videos as "exposés" of "the crazies". She has also described criticism of her online activity as efforts to "cancel and silence" and has said that she receives death threats.

Negative 
Gillian Branstetter, a media strategist for the American Civil Liberties Union, argued that Libs of TikTok "is finding new characters for right-wing propaganda" and that "it's relying on the endless stream of content from TikTok and the Internet to cast any individual trans person as a new villain in their story." Ari Drennen, the LGBTQ program director for the left-leaning media watchdog group Media Matters for America, argued that "Libs of TikTok is basically acting as a wire service for the broader right-wing media ecosystem", adding that the account has "been shaping public policy in a real way, and affecting teachers' ability to feel safe in their classrooms". According to Drennen, she received more than 500 hateful comments about her sexuality and appearance after criticizing Libs of TikTok. Kylie Cheung of Jezebel argued that "Deplatforming hateful accounts like LibsOfTikTok whose online attacks can clearly, quickly escalate into real-life threats is an important step. But it's clear we're in the midst of a terrifying, broader anti-LGBTQ moment right now that's being fueled by pretty much every right-wing media outlet as well as top Republicans." Reina Sultan of Them argued that "social media platforms are not doing enough, not only to limit Libs of TikTok's ability to spread hate, but also to protect LGBTQ+ people in general." Melissa Gira Grant of The New Republic argued that Libs of TikTok "is part of a much larger pattern" of the political right's "embrace of anti-LGBTQ violence". Christopher Wiggins of The Advocate argued that "LibsOfTikTok is [a] voice in an overall climate of anti-LGBTQ+ rhetoric that some correlate to an increase of anti-LGBTQ+ incidents." Elad Nehorai of The Forward argued that Libs of TikTok is "fueling a pogrom against trans youth", comparing accusations of grooming to antisemitic blood libel. LGBT organization GLAAD said in a statement that "Libs of TikTok is synonymous with maliciously targeting LGBTQ organizations, people, and allies by posting lies, misinformation, and blatant hate."

Joan Donovan, research director at Harvard's Shorenstein Center on Media, Politics and Public Policy, argued that "we've reached this phase in social media where people know what to do when an account like Libs of TikTok calls out another account or a person or institution", calling the response to these posts "networked incitement" that can create "a snowball effect, where you see people getting more emboldened to participate". Donovan also argued that "the precipitating comments may not be that incendiary, but if that creates a pattern of attack that is recognizable, which it is with an account like Libs of TikTok, then these companies are well within their jurisdiction to warn and then ban the account." Donovan has drawn parallels between Twitter's handling of Libs of TikTok and Twitter's failure to stop QAnon, the Stop the Steal movement, and the January 6 Capitol attack, which Twitter only started cracking down on after several acts of violence were linked to these movements. She also drew parallels between right-wing media amplifying Libs of TikTok and the online campaign that resulted in the January 6 Capitol attack. Donovan noted that "We're seeing more people feeling — as they did during the insurrection — that storming a hospital might be their only option to defend themselves and their values". Harvard Law School clinical instructor and transgender activist Alejandra Caraballo argued that Twitter has not banned Libs of TikTok for its content because "they don't want to rock the boat politically while the [Elon Musk purchase] is ongoing." Meredithe McNamara, assistant professor of pediatrics at Yale University, argued that "allowing this hate speech to fester on the internet and fuel direct threats is going to create long standing harms that are difficult to recover from".

Positive 
Bethany Mandel, writing in the Deseret News, argued that Libs of TikTok "showcase[s] the ideology and agenda of the far left in their own words" and "gives parents a disturbing look at what their children are seeing on [TikTok]". Brendan O'Neill of Spiked argued that "there are some who would prefer to keep the woke indoctrination of the young, so giddily facilitated by Silicon Valley, shrouded from external concern and criticism. It is they who are in the wrong, not Libs of TikTok." Dan McLaughlin of National Review argued: "The Libs of TikTok account exists to expose sexually deviant ideas and conduct posted publicly on the Internet by people in a position to influence young children. ... her targets volunteer info in their videos about how they use their positions of trust, confidence, and public power to propagandize young children with their ideologies about sex and gender." Fox News host Tucker Carlson defended Libs of TikTok from criticism, saying that "no news organisation in America has done more to reveal the reality in American schools than Libs of TikTok" and called the videos reposted by the account "idiotic and disgusting". Donald Trump Jr. argued that "the question Libs of TikTok often raises And the Left wants to ignore Is do parents have a right to know what their children are being taught in their public school, or not?" Ben Shapiro defended Libs of TikTok from criticism, calling it "a Twitter account that literally just posts Leftists owning themselves." Seth Dillon called Libs of TikTok's work "heroic" and "high-risk". Christina Pushaw has described herself as "a strong supporter of [Libs of TikTok']s mission."

Response to identity reveal 
Bonnie Kristian of The Week argued "the person behind Libs of TikTok doesn't matter much... because conspiracism is communal now", adding that "Lorenz's exposé largely missed the point." Kat Rosenfield of UnHerd called The Washington Post article "an unmasking worthy of a demented superhero story", adding that "it's hard to know what Libs of TikTok's greater sin is: being wrong, or being popular." Dan McLaughlin of National Review argued that identity reveals like that of Libs of TikTok have "become standard practice for major media reporters who do stories on people on the right who can be framed as 'extremists.'"

Kara Alaimo, a Hofstra University professor and former Obama administration staffer writing for NBC News, dismissed criticism regarding identifying the individual running the account, arguing that "the people in need of protection here are those who are being targeted with hate simply because of their identities not the people who are hurling the abuse, like Raichik."

Writing about the revealing of Raichik's identity, Kaitlyn Tiffany of The Atlantic argued that "where the term [doxxing] once defined a category, it now expresses an emotion. Whoever feels doxxed will claim to have been doxxed."

Commentator and conspiracy theorist Jack Posobiec tweeted: "This isn't journalism. This is doxxing and smearing of Libs of TikTok by the billionaire-controlled Bezos Post".

Some Jewish critics, including watchdog organization StopAntisemitism.org and Jewcy magazine editor Isaac de Castro, argued that Lorenz's mention of Raichik's Orthodox Judaism was unnecessary and promoted antisemitism. Andrew Silow-Carroll, editor in chief of The Jewish Week, defended the inclusion of Raichik's religious beliefs in a blog for The Times of Israel, arguing that it "shed light on the growing connection between faith and right-wing politics".

Other responses 
In April 2022, another Orthodox Jew named Chaya Raichik, a stay-at-home mom who grew up in Los Angeles, received hundreds of negative messages from people who mistook her for the person behind Libs of TikTok. Also in April, YouTuber Tim Pool and The Daily Wire CEO Jeremy Boreing purchased a billboard in Times Square to accuse Lorenz of doxxing Libs of TikTok. In response, Lorenz called the billboard "so idiotic it's hilarious".

Television appearance by Raichik
Raichik made her first-ever in-person televised appearance on the December 27, 2022 episode of Tucker Carlson Today. In the episode, she stated, "The LGBTQ community has become this cult, and it's so captivating, and it pulls people in so strongly... They're just evil. They're bad people. They're just evil people, and they want to groom kids. They're recruiting." Following her appearance, some news outlets have linked her to a person who may have trespassed on federal property during the January 6 United States Capitol attack.

See also 
 LGBT rights in the United States
 Transphobia in the United States

Notes

References

American conspiracy theorists
Anti-drag sentiment
Anti-LGBT sentiment
Alt-right
Conservative media in the United States
Conspiracist media
Disinformation operations
Facebook criticisms and controversies
Far-right politics in the United States
Harassment
Instagram accounts
Internet-based activism
LGBT-related controversies in the United States
LGBT youth
Political extremism in the United States
Social media accounts
TikTok
Twitter accounts
Twitter controversies